was an athletic stadium in Tokyo, Japan.

It hosted the 1923 Emperor's Cup and final game between Astra Club and Nagoya Shukyu-Dan was played there.

Defunct sports venues in Japan
Defunct football venues in Japan